This article provides a list of the largest hydroelectric power stations by generating capacity. Only plants with capacity larger than 3,000 MW are listed.

The Three Gorges Dam in Hubei, China, has the world's largest instantaneous generating capacity (22,500 MW), with Baihetan Dam from the same nation in second place with a capacity of (16,000 MW). The Itaipu Dam in Paraguay/Brazil is the third largest with (14,000 MW). Despite the large difference in installed capacity between Three Gorges Dam and Itaipu Dam, they generate nearly equal amounts of electrical energy during the course of an entire year - Itaipu 103 TWh in 2016 and Three Gorges 111.8 TWh in 2020, because the Three Gorges experiences six months per year when there is very little water available to generate power, while the Paraná River that feeds the Itaipu has a much lower seasonal variance in flow. Energy output of the Three Gorges reaches 125 TWh in years of high feed availability.

The Three Gorges (22,500 MW - 32 × 700 MW and 2 × 50 MW) is operated jointly with the much smaller Gezhouba Dam (2,715 MW), the total generating capacity of this two-dam complex is 25,215 MW. The Itaipu on the Brazil–Paraguay border has 20 generator units with overall 14,000 MW of installed capacity, however the maximum number of generating units allowed to operate simultaneously cannot exceed 18 (12,600 MW).

The Jinsha River (the upper stream of Yangtze River) complex is the largest hydroelectric generating system currently under construction. It has three phases. Phase one includes four dams on the downstream of the Jinsha River. They are Wudongde Dam, Baihetan Dam, Xiluodu Dam, and Xiangjiaba Dam, with generating capacity of 10,200 MW, 16,000 MW, 13,860 MW, and 6,448 MW respectively. Phase two includes eight dams on the middle stream of the Jinsha River. The total generating capacity is 21,150 MW. Phase three includes eight dams on the upper stream of the Jinsha River. The total generating capacity is 8,980 MW. The total combined capacity of the Jinsha complex with the Three Gorges complex will be 101,853 MW.

Preliminary plans exist for the construction of the next largest hydroelectric power station with an installed capacity of 39,000 MW. The Project is called Grand Inga and is planned to be realised on the lower Congo River. China is said to have been working on a 50,000 MW dam as part of the Yarlung Tsangpo Hydroelectric and Water Diversion Project.

The largest hydroelectric power stations top the list of the largest power stations of any kind, are among the largest hydraulic structures and are some of the largest artificial structures in the world.

List

Completed 
Only operational power stations with an installed capacity of at least 3,000 MW. Some of these may have additional units under construction, but only current installed capacity is listed.

Under construction 
This table lists stations under construction with an expected installed capacity at least 3,000 MW.

See also 
 List of conventional hydroelectric power stations
 List of run-of-the-river hydroelectric power stations
 List of pumped-storage hydroelectric power stations
 List of largest power stations in the world
 List of tallest dams in the world
 List of largest dams
 List of largest power stations in the United States

Notes

References 

Hydroelectric
Economy-related lists of superlatives
Hydroelectric power stations
Power stations, hydroelectric
Hydroelectric power stations